Oued Ellil is a town and commune in the Manouba Governorate, Tunisia. As of 2004, it had a population of 47,614.

See also
List of cities in Tunisia

References

Populated places in Tunisia
Communes of Tunisia
Tunisia geography articles needing translation from French Wikipedia